Inside the Mind of a Serial Killer is a British true crime television series, made by FirstLookTV. It examines the crimes of various serial killers and speculates what may have made them kill. The show regularly features psychologists Linda Papadopoulos, Glenn Wilson, and journalist Paola Totaro.

Episodes

Season 1
 S01E01 Eddie Leonski
 S01E02 Angus Sinclair
 S01E03 Anders Behring Breivik
 S01E04 Surinder Koli
 S01E05 Mark Errin Rust
 S01E06 Stephen Griffiths
 S01E07 Joanna Dennehy
 S01E08 Israel Keyes
 S01E09 Anthony Sowell
 S01E10 Michel Fourniret and Monique Olivier

Season 2
 S02E01 Anthony Shore
 S02E02 Kieran Kelly
 S02E03 Ian Brady and Myra Hindley
 S02E04 Sheila LaBarre
 S02E05 Douglas Perry
 S02E06 Todd Kohlhepp
 S02E07 William Inmon
 S02E08 Elizabeth Wettlaufer
 S02E09 Theodore Johnson
 S02E10 Richard Dorrough

See Also
Born to Kill?
Great Crimes and Trials
Most Evil

References

External Links
Inside the Mind of a Serial Killer on IMDB.com
Inside the Mind of a Serial Killer on STV Player

2015 British television series debuts
2016 British television series endings
True crime television series
2010s British documentary television series
British crime television series
Non-fiction works about serial killers
Television series about serial killers